Xports was a South Korean sports television channel, jointly owned and operated by CJ Media and IB Sports (now Galaxia SM).

On August 13, 2009, SBS took over the channel, and on December 28, it was replaced by SBS Biz.

Seoul Broadcasting System television networks
Korean-language television stations
Television channels and stations established in 2009